Daviesia rhizomata is a species of flowering plant in the family Fabaceae and is endemic to the south-west of Western Australia. It is a low, rhizome-forming shrub with tangled branchlets, scattered, needle-like, sharply pointed phyllodes, and yellow and red flowers.

Description

Taxonomy
Daviesia rhizomata was first formally described in 1995 by Michael Crisp in Australian Systematic Botany from specimens he collected near Hyden in 1979. The specific epithet (rhizomata) means "rhizome-possessing".

Distribution and habitat
This daviesia grows in tall heath and mallee between Hyden, Lake Grace and Newdegate in the Coolgardie and Mallee biogeographic regions of south-western Western Australia.

Conservation status 
Daviesia rhizomata is listed as "not threatened" by the Government of Western Australia Department of Biodiversity, Conservation and Attractions.

References 

rhizomata
Taxa named by Michael Crisp
Plants described in 1995
Flora of Western Australia